The FOM-Ukraine is political sociology company in Ukraine. It is joint venture of the FOM (Moscow and Ukrainian Marketing Group, Kyiv.

Results of exit poll performed by FOM (Moscow) company favoring Viktor Yanukovych were the only allowed to be publicized on TV during Ukrainian presidential election in 2004. All others polling was censored.

References

External links
 

Public opinion research companies
Privately held companies of Ukraine
Companies established in 2006
2006 establishments in Ukraine